Vutcani is a commune in Vaslui County, Western Moldavia, Romania. It is composed of three villages: Mălăiești, Poșta Elan and Vutcani.

Notable residents include academic Gheorghe Ivănescu (1912–1987).

References

Communes in Vaslui County
Localities in Western Moldavia